Kalinovka is the name of several rural localities in Russia:
Kalinovka, Khomutovsky District, Kursk Oblast, a selo in Khomutovsky District of Kursk Oblast; birthplace of Nikita Khrushchev
Kalinovka, Oktyabrsky District, Kursk Oblast, a khutor in Oktyabrsky District of Kursk Oblast
Kalinovka, Timsky District, Kursk Oblast, a village in Timsky District of Kursk Oblast
Kalinovka, Zheleznogorsky District, Kursk Oblast, a village in Zheleznogorsky District of Kursk Oblast
Kalinovka, name of several other rural localities